The current ratio is a  liquidity ratio that measures whether a firm has enough resources to meet its short-term obligations. It compares a firm's current assets  to its current liabilities, and is expressed as follows:-

The current ratio is an indication of a firm's liquidity.  Acceptable current ratios vary from industry to industry.  In many cases, a creditor would consider a high current ratio to be better than a low current ratio, because a high current ratio indicates that the company is more likely to pay the creditor back. Large current ratios are not always a good sign for investors. If the company's current ratio is too high it may indicate that the company is not efficiently using its current assets or its short-term financing facilities.

If current liabilities exceed current assets the current ratio will be less than 1. A current ratio of less than 1 indicates that the company may have problems meeting its short-term obligations. Some types of businesses can operate with a current ratio of less than one, however.  If inventory turns into cash much more rapidly than the accounts payable become due, then the firm's current ratio can comfortably remain less than one. Inventory is valued at the cost of acquiring it and the firm intends to sell the inventory for more than this cost. The sale will therefore generate substantially more cash than the value of inventory on the balance sheet. Low current ratios can also be justified for businesses that can collect cash from customers long before they need to pay their suppliers.

Limitations 
 The ratio is only useful when two companies are compared within industry because inter industry business operations differ substantially.
 To determine liquidity, the current ratio is not as helpful as the quick ratio, because it includes all those assets that may not be easily liquidated, like prepaid expenses and inventory.

See also
Debt ratio
Quick ratio
Ratio

References

Financial ratios
Working capital management